USNS Yukon has been the name of more than one United States Navy ship:

 , an oiler in service in the Military Sea Transportation Service and Military Sealift Command from 1957 to 1985
 , a fleet replenishment oiler in service with the Military Sealift Command since 1994

See also